Admiral Ommanney may refer to:

Erasmus Ommanney (1814–1904), British Royal Navy admiral
John Ommanney (1773–1855), British Royal Navy admiral
Robert Nelson Ommanney (1854–1938), British Royal Navy vice admiral